Double-Shot is a studio album by jazz trumpeter Chet Baker and the Mariachi Brass recorded in 1966 and released on the World Pacific label.

Reception

Allmusic rated the album with 2 stars.

Track listing
 "Dancing in the Street" (Marvin Gaye, William "Mickey" Stevenson, Ivy Jo Hunter) – 2:18   
 "Ring of Fire" (June Carter, Merle Kilgore) – 2:10   
 "Yesterday's Gone" (Chad Stuart, Wendy Kidd) – 2:29   
 "Danke Schoen" (Bert Kaempfert, Kurt Schwabach, Milt Gabler) – 2:12   
 "The Blue Dove" (Farlan Myer, Hal Levy) – 2:17   
 "Red Rubber Ball" (Paul Simon, Bruce Woodley) – 2:22   
 "When You're Smiling" (Larry Shay, Mark Fisher, Joe Goodwin) – 1:50   
 "Enamorado" (Keith Colley, Paul Rubio) – 1:59   
 "Agua Caliente" (Mike Miller, George Freeborn) – 2:30   
 "Wheels" (Richard Stephens, Jimmy Torres, Norman Petty) – 2:05   
 "But Not Today" (Buddy Scott, Jimmy Radcliffe, Bert Kaempfert) – 2:37   
 "Green Grass" (Roger Greenaway, Roger Cook) – 2:10

Personnel
Chet Baker – flugelhorn
The Mariachi Brass
George Tipton – arranger, conductor

References 

1966 albums
Chet Baker albums
Pacific Jazz Records albums
Albums arranged by George Tipton
World Pacific Records albums
Albums conducted by George Tipton